The Saab H engine is a redesign of the Saab B engine, which in turn was based on the Triumph Slant-4 engine.

Despite the name it is not an H engine or horizontally opposed engine, but a slanted inline-4. The H engine was introduced in 1981 in the Saab 900 and was also used in the Saab 99 from 1982 onwards.
H stood for high compression; higher compression was part of the update from B to H engine. It continued in use in the 900/9-3, 9000, and 9-5. The 2003 GM Epsilon-based 9-3 switched to the GM Ecotec engine, leaving the 9-5 as the sole user of the H engine. The H family of engine was used in the first-generation 9-5 until it was discontinued in 2010. The tooling and know-how was sold to BAIC. 
The latter B2X4 and B2X5 engines have in practice nothing in common with the early B engines except cylinder spacing.

All versions feature a grey cast iron block and an aluminum head with a single or double overhead chain driven camshafts. SOHC engines use two valves per cylinder and DOHC versions use four valves per cylinder with a pentroof chamber, the valve angle being 22 degrees from vertical. All engines use flat inverted bucket type valve lifters, hydraulic in the case of DOHC engines.

The engines were given numbers, for instance B201 is a 2.0-litre (20) engine with one camshaft.

B201

B201 is the original H engine with two valves per cylinder and a single overhead camshaft. It was introduced in 1981 and unlike the B engine it did not have the central shaft which used to power the distributor, oil- and coolant pump. Instead the distributor is located at the front of the cylinder head and directly driven by the camshaft, while the integrated waterpump was replaced with a separate unit to the rear of the engine.

In 1986 an intercooled version of the turbo engine also became available, it produces  at 5500 rpm.

Valmet Automotive in Uusikaupunki also planned a downsized 1.6 liter version of B201, to better suit Finnish vehicle tax laws. Downsizing was made by using a narrower cylinder bore. The prototype engine produced  at 5400 rpm, fitted with Bosch K-Jetronic fuel injection. One such prototype engine is displayed in the Uusikaupunki Saab museum.

B202 and B212 

In 1984, Saab added a 16 valve cylinder head with double overhead camshafts. They retroactively renamed the 8-valve version the B201 and used B202 as the name of the new multi-valve unit. Another notable addition to the B202 was hydraulic valve lifters and Ecopower ("ep" in Italy, "(900)S" elsewhere), with a pre-heated catalytic converter for reduced emissions.

The inlet manifold was enlarged and redesigned for better and greater flow. The intake manifold and the head from the 2.1-litre constitute a well-known replacement for 1985-1993 16 valve, 2.0-litre turbocharged Saabs. Power increase is modest at stock boost but becomes much more evident at higher boost levels.

Engine builder John Nicholson also developed a Formula Three engine from the B202, for use in a Reynard 853 chassis. This version one of the first to use Saab's direct ignition system (SDI) and produced  at 5600 rpm. Its other strength was high power in an unusually broad powerband for a naturally aspirated racing engine.

B204 and B234 

A major redesign of the H engine came in 1990 in the form of the new B234 for the Saab 9000. With this increased stroke also came a new engine block with increased deck height to make sufficient room for the increased stroke length without being forced to use shorter connecting rods, and in-block counter-rotating balance shafts for reduced vibration (NVH). There are two generations of B234 engine, one made from 1990-1993, the other from 1994 to 1998. The later motors had a revised oil sump system, head, timing cover, and different bell housing pattern. Unlike the previous B202, the block was no longer angled, but straight, something that made it unsuitable for the 900 model with its gearbox under the engine, built into the engine oil sump. The longer stroke B234 was last produced in 1998, that being the last year for the 9000 model. The B234 was selected as one of Ward's 10 Best Engines for 1995 and 1996.

The B202 was still being produced in 1993, but for the new generation Saab 900 being released in 1994 a new 2.0L engine was required. This new engine, the B204, was based on the 9000's B234, but in order to make the engine fit in the 900 the engine had to be shortened. This meant that a new chain drive for the camshafts was required to reduce the length of the engine. The B204 engine was available with natural aspiration in 900, 9000 and 9-3 in the form of 2.0i (B204i), with a low pressure turbo in the form of 9000 and 9-3 2.0t (B204E) or Saab 900 and 9-3 2.0T (B204L). B204R was briefly available in the 1999 9-3 Aero (U.S. market 'SE') model. B204 was in production in the Saab 9-3 until 2000, when it was replaced by B205.

With the introduction of the OBDII compliant B204 (also coincidental with the introduction of Trionic T5.5) Saab embarked on a new concept they termed as "Ecopower" where engines were designed for high power output while also delivering exceptional economy and low environmental impact.

Turbocharged engines used Garrett T25 turbochargers and the B234R (9000 Aero manual) used a Mitsubishi Heavy Industries TD04HL-15G-6 in model year -93 and TD04HL-15T-6 later on.

The B204 and B234 are regarded by engine tuners as the preferable engine for performance tuning over the later B205 and B235 engines as the internals are of a higher strength. The later models had lightened internal components to improve efficiency and fuel economy but limit the total power output when the engine's software is revised to increase the boost pressures and specific power output. The B204 engine became a very popular engine swap for Vauxhall and Opel Astra, Calibra, Cavalier and Vectras with the GM T-body platform, in Scandinavia in the mid 2000s—the engine uses the same mounting positions due to sharing the same platform. In the UK it is swapped into rotary equipped Mazda RX8, in Ukraine and Russia it is a swap option for Daewoo (now Chevrolet) models of similar age.

Note: The primary difference between the B204L and the B204R is with the intercooler, the turbo, the wastegate 'base boost' setting.

B206
The B206 is a version of the B204 but without the dual balance shafts. It was only offered as a naturally aspirated engine B206I producing , seemingly a Europe-only option in 1994 non-turbo 900 NGs. This engine is popular among Saab tuners in Sweden (e.g. Trollspeed) due to the lack of balance shafts but with presumably equal strength as the turbo blocks with balance shafts.

B205 and B235 
The B205 and B235 engines are an evolution of the B204 and B234 engines. They were introduced in the 1998 Saab 9-5 giving reduced fuel consumption and emissions with improved refinement. The changes included lightweight internal components:lighter valves, softer valve springs, lighter pistons, and lower-drag oil pump. Another development was the introduction of the Trionic 7 torque demand type engine management system. Trionic 7 equipped engines have the black direct ignition casing on top of the engine rather than the red of the Trionic 5.

BAIC 
BAIC offers the Saab H engine in various configurations on several of its models. The B205RGA and B235RGA, 2.0 and 2.3 litre turbo engines are available similar to those used in Saabs. Further BAIC offers a smaller 1.8 litre displacement version named B185RGA. This version was developed to meet requirement for government vehicle with maximum displacement of 1.8 litres. BAIC continued the development of the Saab H engine. In 2015, a B236R prototype was unveiled at the Shanghai Autoshow. This engine design incorporates variable valve timing and an EGR system which allows the engine to comply with Euro 6 emission standards.

The BAIC BJ40L is available with a  engine named B201R and a  engine named B231R. A  engine named B205EFA is offered in the Senova X65. The BAIC BJ80 is also available with the  B231R engine variant. The B201R and B231R models do not use Saab's Trionic engine management system and direct ignition cassette.

Successor to the Saab H-Engine
The H-engine ended production with the 1st Generation Saab 9-5 in 2009 when the intellectual property was transferred to BAIC. Starting in 2003 with the 9-3 Sport Sedan, Saab began utilizing the L850 engine Ecotec. Beginning in 2010 with the 2nd generation 9-5, all Saabs utilized the Ecotec. There were some technologies carried over into the Ecotec line from the Saab H-engine, but for the most part there is very little similarity between the two engine families. Saab continued to use its Trionic engine management system with the Ecotec.

See also
 Saab Variable Compression engine
 Saab V8

References

External links
 Matthew Phenix. "Liquor Does It Quicker". Popular Science, July 2005.
 

Gasoline engines by model
H
Slant-four engines